Laurel Airport may refer to:

 Laurel Airport (Costa Rica), an airport serving Laurel, Costa Rica (ICAO: MRLE)
 Laurel Airport (Delaware), an airport serving Laurel, Delaware, United States (FAA: N06)
 Laurel Municipal Airport, an airport serving Laurel, Montana, United States (FAA: 6S8)
 Hesler-Noble Field, an airport serving Laurel, Mississippi, United States (FAA/IATA: LUL)

Other airports in places named Laurel:
 Hattiesburg-Laurel Regional Airport, an airport serving Laurel, Mississippi, United States (FAA/IATA: PIB)
 Suburban Airport, an airport serving Laurel, Maryland, United States (FAA: W18)